This is a list of timelines of events over the period of World War II.

Main timelines World War II  
 Timeline of events preceding World War II
 Timeline of World War II (1939)
 Timeline of World War II (1940)
 Timeline of World War II (1941)
 Timeline of World War II (1942)
 Timeline of World War II (1943)
 Timeline of World War II (1944)
 Timeline of World War II (1945–1991)

Wars, campaigns, and battles
 Timeline of the invasion of Poland (1939)
 Timeline of the Battle of France (1939–1940)
 Timeline of the Battle of the Atlantic (1939–1945)
 Timeline of the Winter War (1939–1940)
 Timeline of the Norwegian Campaign (1940)
 Timeline of the North African Campaign (1940–1943)
 Timeline of the Eastern Front of World War II (1941–1945)

Others 
 Timeline of declarations of war during World War II
 Timeline of the United Kingdom home front during World War II (1939–1945)
 Timeline of the Molotov–Ribbentrop Pact (1918–1941)
 Timeline of Sweden during World War II (1939–1945)
 Timeline of the Manhattan Project (1939–1947)
 Timeline of air operations during the Battle of Europe
 Timeline of the Holocaust
 Timeline of the Holocaust in Norway
 Timeline of Treblinka extermination camp
 Timeline of deportations of French Jews to death camps
 Timeline of Allied World War II conferences
 Timeline of Irish maritime events during World War II
 Timeline of the first premiership of Winston Churchill

See also

 Timeline of World War I (1914–1918)
 Timeline of the Weimar Republic
 Timeline of the Second Italo-Ethiopian War
 Timeline of the Spanish Civil War

External links 
 WW2DB: Day-by-Day Timeline
 HistoryOrb.com

Chronology of World War II
World War II
Lists of events lists